The Libri of Aleister Crowley is a list of texts mostly written or adapted by Aleister Crowley. Some are attributed to other authors. The list was intended for students of Crowley's magical order, the A∴A∴.

Classes 
The publications of the A∴A∴ divide themselves into five classes:
 Class A consists of books of which may be changed not so much as the style of a letter; that is, they represent the utterance of an Adept entirely beyond the criticism of even the Visible Head of the Organization;
 Class B consists of books or essays which are the result of ordinary scholarship, enlightened and earnest;
 Class C consists of matter which is to be regarded rather as suggestive than anything else;
 Class D consists of the Official Rituals and Instructions;
 Class E consists of public announcements and broadsheets.
Some publications are composite, and pertain to more than one class. O.T.O. documents are not assigned to any A∴A∴ class.

List 
Many of the books and articles are major works of Aleister Crowley. This is a listing with liber number, Roman number, class, full title, and a short description.

References

Further reading
Cornelius, J. Edward, et al.

External links 
Libri Thelemae
Online Books by Aleister Crowley at University of Pennsylvania

Thelemite texts
Works by Aleister Crowley